Pieces is the second album by Michele Stodart, released on the One Little Indian label on 8 July 2016. The album features contributions from The Magic Numbers (and brother) Romeo Stodart, Kathryn Williams & The Goat Roper Band.

Tracklisting 

 Come Back Home
 When It Is Over?
 Once In A While
 Just Anyone Won't Do
 Oh By & By
 Ain't No Woman
 Something About You
 Will You Wait?
 Over The Hill

Personnel 

 Michele Stodart - vocals, acoustic guitar, bass, backing vocals, percussion, electric guitar & harmonium
 CJ Jones - drums & percussion
 Matt Skipper - electric guitar & glockenspiel
 Romeo Stodart - electric guitar, piano and Hammond organ
 Kathryn Williams - backing vocals
 Will Harvey - violin & viola
 Leo Van Bulow-Quirk -  cello
 Richard Causon - piano & Hammond organ
 Goat Roper Band - backing vocals
 Correigh Anne Killick - backing vocals

Production 

 All songs written & produced by Michele Stodart
 Engineering and production by Ben Amesbury & Richard Causon
 Additional engineering by Ber Quinn
 Mixed by Dave Izumi Lynch at Echo Zoo Studios
 Mastered by Miles Sherwell at Abbey Road Studios
 Photography by Gavin Hammond
 Design layout by Kellie Hutchens

Reception 
Folkradio.co.uk reviewed the album as "More considered, more intimate and lyrically more about the storytelling" than her debut solo effort. NARC Magazine dubbed it "a beautiful record".

References

External links 

 Official site
 One Little Indian artist page

2016 albums
Folk albums by British artists
Country albums by British artists
Blues albums by British artists